Akkārakkani Nacchumanār (Tamil: அக்காரக்கனி நச்சுமனார்) was a poet of the Sangam period to whom verse 46 of the Tiruvalluva Maalai is ascribed.

Biography
Akkārakkani Nacchumanār was a poet belonging to the late Sangam period (between 1st century BCE and 2nd century CE). The term Akkārakkani denotes the Hindu god Vishnu. Thus, he is believed to have been a follower of Vaishnavism.

View on Valluvar and the Kural
Akkārakkani Nacchumanār wrote verse 46 of the Tiruvalluva Maalai. He opines about Valluvar and the Kural text thus:

See also

 Sangam literature
 List of Sangam poets
 Tiruvalluva Maalai

Citations

References

 
 

Tamil philosophy
Tamil poets
Sangam poets
Tiruvalluva Maalai contributors